Republican Party of American Samoa is the affiliate of the U.S. Republican Party in American Samoa. It is based in the territorial capital of Pago Pago.

The party was founded by Peter Tali Coleman. Coleman was in 1956 the first Samoan to be appointed Governor. He became the first popularly elected Governor in 1977 and won re-election in 1980 and 1988. In 1988, he replaced Governor Fofō Iosefa Fiti Sunia, who had resigned after being convicted of defrauding the U.S. Government.

Coleman's daughter, Aumua Amata Radewagen, is a current Congresswoman and also the party's National Committee Woman. She received the unanimous endorsement from the party in 2018 in order to run for Congress. She is the first woman to represent American Samoa in the U.S. House of Representatives. She is also the first Republican representative in Congress from American Samoa. In 2018, she won reelection with 83.3 percent of the vote, the highest number of votes in American Samoa history. She has represented the party in the Republican National Committee (RNC) since 1986.

In 2008, all delegates were won by John McCain. In the 2012 Republican primary, Mitt Romney won all nine delegates from American Samoa. In the 2016 American Samoa Republican caucuses, Donald Trump won all nine delegates.

Current leadership 
In March 2016, the party elected new leadership in the lead up to the 2016 American Samoa Republican Caucus.

History

In the 2014 elections, Radewagen was elected as American Samoa's Delegate to Congress. After having served fourteen consecutive terms in Washington, DC, Democrat Eni Faleomavaega lost his reelection bid to Republican Aumua Amata during the 2014 American Samoan general election. She won reelection in 2016 with 75.4%, and won reelection with 83.3% of the votes in a three-way race in 2018.

In 2015, the party criticized the Democratic National Committee (DNC) as Tulsi Gabbard did not get the opportunity to participate in televised debates. Gabbard, a Democrat, represents Hawai’i in the U.S. Congress but was born in American Samoa. The Republican Party of American Samoa also planned to invite Gabbard to their next Republican primary debate.

Notable people

Afoa Moega Lutu, former Attorney General of American Samoa; current member of the American Samoa Senate
Amata Coleman Radewagen, current Congresswoman; National Committeewoman for the Republican Party of American Samoa
Fainu'ulelei S. Utu, former senator and Speaker of the House of Representatives 
Galea'i Peni Poumele, former senator; member of the House of Representatives; Lieutenant Governor of American Samoa
John Raynar, current Chairman for Donald Trump for President, American Samoa chapter; Vice Chairman for the Republican Party of American Samoa; at-large delegate to the 2016 Republican National Convention
Peter Tali Coleman, first person of Samoan descent to be appointed Governor and later American Samoa's first popularly elected Governor
Savali Talavou Ale, former Speaker of the House and longest-serving member of the American Samoa House of Representatives
Su'a Schuster, former party Chairman; current national committeeman for the Republican Party of American Samoa; at-large delegate to the 2008, 2012, and 2016 Republican National Conventions.
Te'o J. Fuavai, former Chairman; senator; Speaker of the House and member of the American Samoa House of Representatives
Utu Abe Malae, former Chairperson of the American Samoa Republican Party and member of the American Samoa Senate

See also
List of political parties in American Samoa
American Samoa Republicans

References

External links
Republican Party of American Samoa

1985 establishments in American Samoa
Political parties established in 1985
American Samoa
Politics of American Samoa
Political parties in insular areas of the United States